Adolphe Ganot (born 1804 in Rochefort, Charente-Maritime, France; died 1887 in Paris) was a French author and publisher of physics textbooks. Ganot's textbooks, written during the second half of the nineteenth century, made "...a decisive contribution to physics and its teaching on an international scale". His popular Treatise on Physics (French: Traité de Physique) was translated into several languages.

References

19th-century French writers
French science writers
Textbook writers
People from Rochefort, Charente-Maritime
1804 births
1887 deaths
19th-century French male writers
French male non-fiction writers